The Philippine House Committee on National Defense and Security, or House National Defense and Security Committee is a standing committee of the Philippine House of Representatives.

Jurisdiction 
As prescribed by House Rules, the committee's jurisdiction includes the following:
 Armed Forces of the Philippines
 Citizens army
 Coast
 Forts and arsenals
 Geodetic surveys
 Military bases
 National defense and national security
 Reservations and yards
 Selective services

Members, 18th Congress

Historical members

18th Congress

Vice Chairperson 
 Francisco Datol Jr. (SENIOR CITIZENS)

See also 
 House of Representatives of the Philippines
 List of Philippine House of Representatives committees
 Department of National Defense
 Armed Forces of the Philippines

Notes

References

External links 
House of Representatives of the Philippines

National Defense
Parliamentary committees on Defence
Military of the Philippines